Anna Pirovano (born 8 October 2000) is an Italian swimmer. 

She participated at the 2015 European Games, 2016 European Junior Swimming Championships, 2017 European Junior Swimming Championships winning a silver medal, 2018 Mediterranean Games, 2018 Summer Youth Olympics.

At the 2021 Italian championship, she was third in the 100 meter fly.

She swam for GS Fiamme Azzurre, and SMGM Team Nuoto Lombardia.

References 

2000 births
Living people
Italian female swimmers
Swimmers at the 2015 European Games
European Games competitors for Italy
Swimmers at the 2018 Mediterranean Games
Mediterranean Games bronze medalists for Italy
Mediterranean Games medalists in swimming
Swimmers at the 2018 Summer Youth Olympics
21st-century Italian women
Competitors at the 2022 World Games
World Games silver medalists